Verden (Aller) or Verden an der Aller is a railway station located in Verden an der Aller, Germany. The station was opened in 1847 and is located on the Bremen–Hanover railway and Rotenburg-Verden railway. The train services are operated by Deutsche Bahn and NordWestBahn. The station has been part of the Bremen S-Bahn since December 2010.

Train services
The following services currently call at the station:

Intercity services (IC 56) Norddeich - Emden - Oldenburg - Bremen - Hanover - Braunschweig - Magdeburg - Leipzig / Berlin - Cottbus
Regional services  Norddeich - Emden - Oldenburg - Bremen - Nienburg - Hanover
Regional services  Bremerhaven-Lehe - Bremen - Nienburg - Hanover
Local services  Rotenburg - Verden
Bremen S-Bahn services  Bremen-Farge - Bremen-Vegesack - Bremen - Verden

Bus services
The station is served by the following bus services:

108 Verden - Hilgermissen - Hoya
701 Verden - Armsen - Stemmen - Kirchlinteln
711 Verden - Dauelsen
712 Verden Town Service
713 Verden - Luttum - Kirchlinteln
714 Verden Town Service
715 Verden - Eitzel - Kirchlinteln - Bendingborstel
717 Verden - Hutbergen
718 Verden Town Service
720 Verden - Blender - Thedinghausen - Bruchhausen - Vilsen
725 Rotenburg - Hellwege - Verden
735 Verden - Dörverden - Hassel—Hoya-Eystrup
740 Bremen - Achim - Langwedel - Verden
760 Fischerhude - Ottersberg - Verden
765 Verden - Dörverden - Rethem

References

External links 
 

Railway stations in Lower Saxony
Railway stations in Germany opened in 1847
Buildings and structures in Verden (district)
Bremen S-Bahn